Mateo Carabajal (born 21 February 1997) is an Argentine professional footballer who plays as a centre-back for Independiente del Valle.

Career
Carabajal started his senior career with Arsenal de Sarandí, who signed him from Estudiantes Unidos in 2014. Sergio Rondina promoted him into their squad during the 2017–18 Argentine Primera División campaign, selecting Carabajal for his professional bow on 14 April 2018 against Belgrano. He featured in a league match with Defensa y Justicia a month later, as Arsenal were relegated to Primera B Nacional.

On 30 July 2021, Carabajal joined Ecuadorian club Independiente del Valle.

Career statistics
.

References

External links

1997 births
Living people
Sportspeople from Buenos Aires Province
Argentine footballers
Argentine expatriate footballers
Association football defenders
Arsenal de Sarandí footballers
C.S.D. Independiente del Valle footballers
Argentine Primera División players
Primera Nacional players
Ecuadorian Serie A players
Argentine expatriate sportspeople in Ecuador
Expatriate footballers in Ecuador